Mafranqah (also Romanized as Mafranqāh, Merafneqā, and Mafranqā; also known as Marfanqā) is a village in Faruj Rural District, in the Central District of Faruj County, North Khorasan Province, Iran. At the 2006 census, its population was 715, in 183 families.

References 

Populated places in Faruj County